Carlos Bienvenido Front Barrera (born 20 November 1980) is a Spanish rower. He competed in the men's eight event at the 1992 Summer Olympics as part of the Spanish team that finished 14th.

References

External links
 

1980 births
Living people
Spanish male rowers
Olympic rowers of Spain
Rowers at the 1992 Summer Olympics
People from Montsià
Sportspeople from the Province of Tarragona
20th-century Spanish people
21st-century Spanish people